The First Texas Legislature convened from February 16 to May 13, 1846 in regular session. Members of the House of Representatives and Senate were elected in December 1845, after an election on October 13, 1845 that ratified the proposed state constitution.

Sessions
 1st Regular session: February 16–May 13, 1846

Party summary

Officers

Senate
 Lieutenant Governor Albert Clinton Horton, Democrat
 President pro tempore Edward Burleson, Democrat

House of Representatives
 Speaker of the House
 William Crump, Democrat, February 16 – May 1, 1846
 William H. Bourland, Democrat, May 1–11, 1846
 Stephen W. Perkins, Democrat, May 11–13, 1846
 Speaker of the House pro tempore
John Brown, Democrat, acting Speaker March 3–9, 1846
Edward Thomas Branch, Democrat, acting Speaker March 9–16, 1846

Members

Senate
Members of the Texas Senate for the First Texas Legislature:

House of Representatives
Members of the House of Representatives for the First Texas Legislature:

Membership changes

Senate

Alyssa Petty Third Texas Senate

Notes

References

External links

1
1846 in Texas
1846 U.S. legislative sessions